Jacques-Maurice des Landes d’Aussac de Saint Palais (November 15, 1811 – June 28, 1877) was an American prelate of the Roman Catholic Church. He served as the fourth Bishop of Vincennes, from 1848 until his death.

Biography
De Saint Palais was born in La Salvetat, and ordained to the priesthood on May 28, 1836 in the Church of Saint-Sulpice, Paris. Bishop Simon Bruté had traveled to France to recruit priests for his new Diocese of Vincennes. In July 1836 De Saint Palais left to join Bruté in America, where he served in various parishes.

Bishop
After the death of the third bishop, Bishop Jean Bazin, De Saint Palais served as administrator until he was named the fourth bishop on October 3, 1848 by Pope Pius IX. He received his episcopal consecration on January 14, 1849 from Bishop Richard Miles, OP, with Bishops Martin Spalding and Hippolyte Du Pontavice, vicar general of Vincennes, serving as co-consecrators.

He closed the diocesan seminary at St. Gabriel's College and began an orphan asylum called St. Vincent's using the seminary building. He championed the building of a new motherhouse for the Sisters of Providence of Saint Mary-of-the-Woods and was in frequent correspondence with their foundress, Saint Mother Theodore Guerin. In 1849 Guerin established St. Ann's orphanage in Vincennes. In 1854 monks from Einsiedeln, Switzerland, founded St. Meinrad abbey and seminary in southern Indiana.

During his time in the diocese, the Catholic population grew from about 30,000 to 80,000. In 1857 part of the diocese was split off to form the  Diocese of Fort Wayne and made suffragan to Cincinnati. 

Bishop De Saint Palais had to contend with both a cholera epidemic, and the American Civil War, during which several priests from the diocese served as chaplains. He recognized that Indianapolis had become a major city, but deferred the decision to move the seat of the diocese to his successor.

The Bishop died at St. Mary-of-the-Woods, Indiana, at the age of 65 and is buried in the crypt of the Old Cathedral in Vincennes.

References

External links

Archdiocese of Indianapolis - Bishops and Archbishops of the Archdiocese

1811 births
1877 deaths
French Roman Catholic bishops in North America
French emigrants to the United States
19th-century Roman Catholic bishops in the United States
Roman Catholic bishops of Vincennes
Burials at the St. Francis Xavier Cathedral and Library